Manuel Zappadu (born 14 May 1990 in Olbia), known as Hell Raton, is an Italian rapper and record producer. He is best known for his project Machete Empire Records and his crew Machete Crew, founded in 2010 with Salmo, Slait and En?gma (the latter having exited it in 2016); as well as for being one of the four judges in the fourteenth season of X Factor Italia, which was won by  who formed part of his category (Girls). He returned for the fifteenth season and won again with Baltimora.

Biography 
In 2020 he was engaged in some charitable projects such as Machete Aid on Twitch.tv for those working in the music industry and facing the crisis caused by the COVID-19 pandemic. In 2021, he also won the fifteenth edition of X Factor with his pupil Baltimora.

Judicial proceedings 
In 2020 the newspaper  reported that Zappadu was accused of the crime of complicity in aggravated personal injury, along with 11 other people. According to the accusation, the rapper was part of a group of 12 boys who in 2015 beat 3 young people in front of a nightclub in Ortacesus.

Discography

Mixtapes 

 2011 – Basura Muzik Vol. 1 (published as El Raton)

EP 

 2014 – Rattopsy EP (published as El Raton)

Singles 

 As El Raton

 2011 – Multicultural
 2013 – The Island (Salmo feat. El Raton & Enigma)
 2014 – Paper Street (feat. DJ Slait)
 2014 – 

 As Hell Raton

 2017 – Buganda Rock
 2017 – Hell Taxi

Collaborations 

 2012 – Machete Crew – Machete Mixtape
 2012 – DJ Slait – Bloody Vinyl
 2012 – Machete Crew – Machete Mixtape Vol II
 2014 – Machete Crew – Machete Mixtape III
 2015 – DJ Slait – Bloody Vinyl 2
 2019 – Machete Crew – Machete Mixtape 4
 2020 – DJ Slait, Low Kidd, Tha Supreme e Young Miles – Bloody Vinyl 3

References

External links 

 El Raton / Hell Raton, on Discogs, Zink Media.

1990 births
Italian rappers
Italian record producers
Living people